Soegija is an epic history drama of Indonesia, directed by the senior director of Indonesia Garin Nugroho, about national hero Albertus Soegijapranata. The film, starring actors with a diversity of cultural backgrounds, is launched in Indonesia on 7 June 2012. With a budget of around Rp 12 billion ($1,2 million), the film became the most expensive movie directed by Garin Nugroho so far.

The film was produced with the format that takes the story from the diary of the National Heroes character Mgr. Soegijapranata by taking the background Indonesian National Revolution and the establishment of the United States of Indonesia during the period 1940–1949. The film was directed by veteran director Garin Nugroho and shot within the regional background of Yogyakarta and Semarang. Soegija is not a regular war movie with much combat, but describes the humanity behind the war. It shows how different people from Indonesia, Japan and the Netherlands, civil and military, were dealing with everyday life. Why those people made the choices they made, because of the different backgrounds they all came from.

Synopsis
Though raising the universal aspect of humanity rather than emphasize the religious aspects, this film is about Dutch East Indies (now Indonesia) first indigenous bishop: Monsignor Albertus Soegijapranata SJ, from his inauguration until the end of Indonesia's independence war (1940–1949). This turbulent decade marked by the end of 350 years of Dutch occupation, entry and commencement of Japanese occupation of Indonesia, the Proclamation of Indonesian Independence, and the return of the Netherlands who tried to get Indonesia back as part of their Dutch Empire, which led to the Indonesian National Revolution. Soegija wrote all these events in his diary reflections, and also its participation in relieving the suffering of people in the midst of the chaos of war. He tried to play a role at all levels, local politics, national and international. (For his participation, President Sukarno awarded him with the title of National Hero of Indonesia.)
The film also shows the background and story of the Indonesian nurse Mariyem, Dutch soldier Robert, Dutch war photographer Hendrick and Japanese colonel Nobuzuki, in their own struggle during one of the heaviest periods of Indonesian history.

Cast
 Nirwan Dewanto as Albertus Soegijapranata
 Andrea Reva as Lingling
 Annisa Hertami Kusumastuti as Mariyem
 Butet Kartaredjasa as Koster Toegimin
 Eko cockscomb as Suwito
 Henky Solaiman as Lingling's grandfather
 Landung Simatupang as Mr. Ward
 Margono as Pak Besut
 Marwoto as a Seller of Herbs
 Muhammad Abbe as Maryono
 Nobuyuki Suzuki as Nobuzuki
 Olga Lydia as Lingling's mother
 Rukman Rosadi as Lantip
 Wouter Braaf as Hendrick
 Wouter Zweers as Robert

References

External links
 
 

Indonesian drama films
Indonesian biographical drama films
Films directed by Garin Nugroho
Films shot in Indonesia
Maya Award winners